Ahmed Abdulla (born 11 March 1987), nicknamed Lily is a Maldivian professional footballer who plays for New Radiant SC and Maldives national team.

International career

International goals
Scores and results list Maldives' goal tally first.

References

External links 
 ނިއުގެ ދިރުމަކީ ސަޕޯޓަރުން: ލިލީ

1987 births
Living people
New Radiant S.C. players
Maziya S&RC players
Maldivian footballers
Maldives international footballers
Association football defenders
Place of birth missing (living people)
Footballers at the 2010 Asian Games
Asian Games competitors for the Maldives